Ingeniero Jacobacci is a city in Río Negro Province, Argentina. It has a population of 12,000 inhabitants and was named in honor of Guido Jacobacci (es), the director of the railway opened in 1916 between San Antonio Oeste, on the Atlantic Ocean coast, and Bariloche, in the Andes. A remote outpost in windswept Patagonia, Jacobacci benefited from its proximity to scenic Lake Carri Laufquen (es) and in 1990, an airport was opened to facilitate tourist arrivals in the area. The Line to Esquel is no longer in service as the old locomotive does not run anymore.

See also

Old Patagonian Express

Populated places in Río Negro Province
Cities in Argentina
Argentina
Río Negro Province